Neolithodes indicus is a species of king crab found in the Arabian Sea. It was originally identified erroneously as Lithodes agassizii by A.R.S. Anderson in 1896.

Etymology 
"Neolithodes" is derived from Greek and Latin and means "new stone-crab", while "indicus" is Latin for "Indian".

References 

King crabs
Crustaceans of the Indian Ocean
Crustaceans described in 2020